Räty or Raty is a surname which may refer to:

 Jorma Räty (1946–2007), Finnish weightlifter and bodybuilder
 Laura Räty (born 1977), Finnish politician
 Noora Räty (born 1989), Finnish ice hockey goaltender
 Otto Raty (born 1992), Finnish ice hockey defenceman
 Seppo Räty (born 1962), Finnish javelin thrower

See also
 Rati (given name)
 Ratty (disambiguation)